Yeardsley cum Whaley Urban District was an urban district in Cheshire, England, in the Whaley Bridge area. It was created in 1894 and abolished in 1936 when it was absorbed by Whaley Bridge Urban District, Derbyshire and Disley Rural District, Cheshire.

References

External links
 Archives at The National Archives
 Some history

Urban districts of England
Former districts of Cheshire